The Las Aguilas Mountains are a mountain range in San Benito County, California.

See also
 Panoche Pass

References 

Mountain ranges of Northern California
Mountain ranges of San Benito County, California